The blue danio, Kerr's danio or turquoise danio (Danio kerri), is a tropical fish belonging to the genus Danio in family Cyprinidae.

Distribution and habitat
The blue danio is found on the islands of Langkawi and Ko Yao Yai in Malaysia.

Description
It is a blue-colored, deep-bodied danio with several pinkish/gold lines from tail to gills which may or may not be continuous, over a powder blue side.

In the aquarium
The blue danio is a peaceful, active schooling fish, so is usually kept in groups. They prefer a well-planted environment, but still need plenty of space to school. Blue danios are often kept in water with a 6.5 – 7.0 pH, a water hardness of 8 – 12 dGH, and a temperature range of 73 – 77 °F (23–25 °C).

Mating
Blue danios are egg-scatterers that spawn over coarse gravel beds. They will typically spawn at the first light of day. The eggs will hatch in about 36 hours.

Etymology
The taxonomic name honors A.F.G. Kerr, who collected the first specimen on Ko Yao Yai in 1929.

References

External links
Danio kerri

Danio
Fish described in 1931
Fish of Thailand
Cyprinid fish of Asia